The Movement for a Europe of Liberties and Democracy, abbreviated to MELD, was a national-conservative political party at European level founded in 2011, composed of parties belonging to the Europe of Freedom and Democracy (EFD) group in the European Parliament, with the notable absence of the UK Independence Party, which was a member of the EFD, but not of the MELD. In 2012, MELD received a grant from the European Parliament of €621,482.  Its affiliated political foundation  was the Foundation for a Europe of Liberties and Democracy (FELD), which received a grant of €412,361.  Both were headquartered at 18, rue Cler, in Paris, France. The president of the party was Jacek Wlosowicz.

MELD was dissolved in 2015 by the European Parliament due to misuse of EU funding.

Member parties at dissolution

Former member parties
 - Danish People's Party (joined Alliance of European Conservatives and Reformists)
 - Finns Party (joined Alliance of European Conservatives and Reformists)
 - Lega Nord (joined Movement for a Europe of Nations and Freedom)
 - I Love Italy
 - Order and Justice (joined Alliance for Direct Democracy in Europe)

Notes

External links
 

Eurosceptic parties
Far-right politics in Europe
Pan-European political parties
Right-wing populism in Europe
2011 establishments in the European Union
Political parties established in 2011
Political parties disestablished in 2015